Sinnamary is a town and commune on the coast of French Guiana, between Kourou and Iracoubo. Sinnamary was the second French settlement founded in French Guiana: the town was founded in 1664.

Sinnamary lies on the Sinnamary River and is home to the Guianan Soyuz launch site. In 1792, the first prison for priests and political enemies was constructed in Sinnamary. The town contains an Indonesian community, as well as a Galibi Amerindian community. Both communities produce artwork and jewellery that can be purchased. The main hotel in Sinnamary is the Hôtel du Fleuve.

History

The first colonists arrived in the area in 1624, however the town of Sinnamary was officially established in 1664. Sinnamary was taken twice by the Dutch, and once by the British, until in 1763, it was awarded to France by the Treaty of Paris. In 1764, about 40 families of Acadians, still living in exile after the Grand Dérangement nine years earlier, settled in Sinnamary. In 1792 during the French Revolution, the first prison for priests and political enemies opened in Sinnamary which was a precursor of the penal colony of French Guiana. After Napoleon reintroduced slavery in 1802, the town started to grow, and the discovery of gold caused a second boom.

The Guianan Soyuz launch site is situated within the territory of the Sinnamary commune. Colloquially the site and/or project are thus sometimes called "Soyuz at Sinnamary". However, because most other facilities of the Centre Spatial Guyanais are in the neighbouring and more populous Kourou commune, and because the entire CSG itself is thus often called the Kourou space centre, the Guianan Soyuz site/project is also occasionally called "Soyuz at Kourou", even though this is technically incorrect.

Sports 

Geography

Climate
Sinnamary has a tropical monsoon climate (Köppen climate classification Am).

Transport
Sinnamary can be reached by the National Route 1 between Saint-Laurent-du-Maroni and Cayenne.

Sinnamary is served by the Sinnamary Airport.

Nature
Crique et Pripri Yiyi is a  protected area and wetland located in the commune.

Population

Notable people
 Jean-Victor Castor (1962), politician
 Jean-Claude Darcheville (1975), football player
 Marvin Torvic (1988), football player

See also
Communes of French Guiana
Guiana Space Center
Malmanoury, former village expropriated for the Guiana Space Center
Petit-Saut Dam, gravity dam on the Sinnamary River

References

External links
 Official website (in French)

Communes of French Guiana